The value function of an optimization problem gives the value attained by the objective function at a solution, while only depending on the parameters of the problem. In a controlled dynamical system, the value function represents the optimal payoff of the system over the interval [t, t1] when started at the time-t state variable x(t)=x. If the objective function represents some cost that is to be minimized, the value function can be interpreted as the cost to finish the optimal program, and is thus referred to as "cost-to-go function." In an economic context, where the objective function usually represents utility, the value function is conceptually equivalent to the indirect utility function.

In a problem of optimal control, the value function is defined as the supremum of the objective function taken over the set of admissible controls. Given , a typical optimal control problem is to

subject to

with initial state variable . The value function is then defined as 

The function  that gives the optimal control  based on the current state  is called a feedback control policy, or simply a policy function.

Bellman's principle of optimality roughly states that any optimal policy at time ,  taking the current state  as "new" initial condition must be optimal for the remaining problem. If the value function happens to be continuously differentiable, this gives rise to an important partial differential equation known as Hamilton–Jacobi–Bellman equation,

where the maximand on the right-hand side can also be re-written as the Hamiltonian, as

with  playing the role of the costate variables.

which after replacing the appropriate terms recovers the costate equation

where  is Newton notation for the derivative with respect to time.

The value function is the unique viscosity solution to the Hamilton–Jacobi–Bellman equation. In an online closed-loop approximate optimal control, the value function is also a Lyapunov function that establishes global asymptotic stability of the closed-loop system.

References

Further reading 

Dynamic programming
Optimal control